The 2012 Colonial Athletic Association men's soccer season pertains to all CAA men's college soccer during the 2012 NCAA Division I men's soccer season.

The Delaware Fighting Blue Hens are the defending conference tournament champions, while the James Madison Dukes are the defending regular season winners. While the NCAA season will begin in late August 2012, conference play will not begin until late September or early October 2012.

Changes from 2011 
 VCU Rams have left the conference to join the Atlantic 10 Conference

Teams

Stadiums and locations

Standings

CAA Tournament 

The CAA Tournament will determine the conference's guaranteed berth into the 2012 NCAA Division I Men's Soccer Championship.

Results

References 

 
Colonial Athletic Association